Oliver James Sadler (born 2 April 1987) is an English former first-class cricketer.

Sadler was born at Newcastle-under-Lyme and attended Oriel College, Oxford. While at Oxford he made his debut in first-class cricket for Oxford University against Cambridge University at Oxford in 2006. He played in the same fixtures in 2007 and 2008, as well as playing a first-class match for Oxford UCCE against Middlesex in 2008. Appearing in four first-class matches, Sadler scored 250 runs at an average of 50.00, with a high score of 77. With his slow left-arm orthodox bowling, he also took 3 wickets. Sadler played minor counties cricket for Cheshire from 2006–2008, making six appearances in the Minor Counties Championship.

Notes and references

External links

1987 births
Living people
People from Newcastle-under-Lyme
Alumni of Oriel College, Oxford
English cricketers
Oxford University cricketers
Cheshire cricketers
Oxford MCCU cricketers